Journal of Botany, British and Foreign is a monthly journal that was published from 1863 to 1942, and founded by Berthold Carl Seemann who was the editor until his death in 1871. He was succeeded as editor by Henry Trimen.

References

Bibliography 

  (1863–1922)
  (1834–1940: selected vols.)

External links 

 

Botany journals
Defunct journals
Publications established in 1863
Publications disestablished in 1942
English-language journals
Monthly journals